Wezep is a town in the municipality of Oldebroek, Netherlands. Located in the province of Gelderland, it had about 13,500 inhabitants in 2012. The Wezep railway station, located on the Utrecht–Zwolle railway, is the town's main landmark. The municipality's TV station is called LOCO TV.

Sports 
Wezep has several sport clubs.

Notable residents
 Jan Terlouw (born 1931),  physicist, author and politician
 Lana Wolf (born 1975), singer

Economy
The Plukon Food Group, one of the largest poultry meat companies in Europe, has its headquarters in Wezep.

Gallery

References

 CMV De Eendracht

External links

Populated places in Gelderland
Oldebroek